Rolande Moses (born January 24, 1983 in Saint David Parish, Grenada) is a male amateur boxer from Grenada, who fought at the 2008 Summer Olympics in the men's welterweight division.

He entered into the Olympic Trials with only nine fights. He did not have to qualify for Grenada's Olympic team in the usual manner - that is he did not have to become a national champion or win international qualifying bouts. Instead, Moses is able to box for Grenada on a technicality. Under Olympic rules, countries that are unrepresented can apply for athletes to be given berths at the Games. Grenada applied for, and was given, a berth for Moses. He is considered a long shot to medal at the games.

Moses' family moved to Toronto when he was seven years old. He competed high school and attended Niagara College for two years in which he took Business Administration. At the 2007 World Championships he lost his first bout to Sweden's Abdo-Iriba Yasser by stoppage, at the first Olympic qualifier he was defeated by Diego Chaves: 2:12. At the Olympics 2008 he lost his first round opener to Tureano Johnson of the Bahamas.

Other achievements
Ringside World Championships, Kansas City 2005 (semi-finals) and 2006
The Ray McGibbons Gloves, St.Catharines (Silver)
Provincial Championships, St.Catharines (Gold)

References

External links
 Article
 sports-reference

1983 births
Boxing people from Ontario
Canadian male boxers
Black Canadian boxers
Grenadian male boxers
Living people
Welterweight boxers
Boxers at the 2008 Summer Olympics
Olympic boxers of Grenada
Grenadian emigrants to Canada
People from Saint David Parish, Grenada